Edsbyns IF, is a bandy team from Edsbyn in Ovanåker Municipality in Sweden founded on 6 June 1909. The bandy section of the club was founded as late as in 1925 was formally made a club of its own on 28 June 2000.

Edsbyns IF has played in the highest bandy league in Sweden from 1945–1969 and then again since 1971.

History
Edsbyns IF was founded in 1909.

In September 2003, Edsbyn moved to Edsbyn Arena, the first indoor arena for bandy in Sweden, and won the Swedish Championship final in the end of the season.

In June 2009, the club decided to dissolve the women's bandy team for the 2009–2010 season, while keeping the girls' bandy activity and attempting to re-start the women's team as soon as possible. On 4 October 2009, the women's bandy team Team Hälsingland was established instead, as a cooperation between Bollnäs GIF, Broberg/Söderhamn Bandy, Edsbyns IF and Ljusdals BK.

On 26 March 2004, Edsbyns IF played a men's bandy exhibition game at the Streatham Ice Arena in London against Russian Super League team Vodnik, which ended with a 10-10 draw.

The club's bandy section was awarded the Hälsingland Golden Award in 2004. The award has also been given to various individual sportspeople competing for the club.

Players

Current squad

Honours

Domestic
 Swedish Champions:
 Winners (13): 1952, 1953, 1962, 1978, 2004, 2005, 2006, 2007, 2008, 2017, 2018, 2020, 2022
 Runners-up (8): 1949, 1955, 1958, 1961, 1963, 1982, 1984, 2009

Cup
 Svenska Cupen:
 Winners (3): 2005, 2008, 2019

International
 World Cup:
 Winners (3): 1979, 1991, 2008
 Runners-up (3): 1980, 2005, 2007
 European Cup:
 Winners (2): 2005, 2007
 Runners-up (4): 1978, 2004, 2006, 2008

References

External links
Official website

 
Sport in Gävleborg County
Bandy clubs established in 1909
Bandy clubs in Sweden
1909 establishments in Sweden